The lark-like bunting (Emberiza impetuani) is a species of bird in the family Emberizidae, which is native to south-western Africa.

It is found in Angola, Botswana, Lesotho, Namibia, South Africa, and Zimbabwe.

Its natural habitat is subtropical or tropical dry shrubland.

References

External links
 Lark-like bunting - Species text in The Atlas of Southern African Birds.

Emberiza
Birds of Southern Africa
Birds described in 1836
Taxonomy articles created by Polbot